Bansari may refer to:

 Bansari (1943 film), a 1943 Bollywood social film
 Bansari (1978 film), a 1978 Bengali-language Indian film